Bartow is a town in Jefferson County, Georgia, United States. As of the 2020 census, the city had a population of 186. Initially the town was known as "Spier's Turnout", but was changed to honor the first Confederate officer to die in battle, Colonel Francis S. Bartow of Savannah, Georgia, who was killed at the Battle of Manassas, Virginia on July 21, 1861.

Geography
Bartow is located at  (32.881111, -82.472222).

Demographics

At the 2000 census there were 223 people, 95 households, and 68 families living in the town. The racial makeup of the town was 40.36% White and 59.64% African American. Hispanic or Latino of any race were 1.35%.

Of the 95 households 27.4% had children under the age of 18 living with them, 48.4% were married couples living together, 20.0% had a female householder with no husband present, and 28.4% were non-families. 26.3% of households were one person and 7.4% were one person aged 65 or older.  The average household size was 2.35 and the average family size was 2.82.

The age distribution was 23.8% under the age of 18, 4.5% from 18 to 24, 30.5% from 25 to 44, 27.4% from 45 to 64, and 13.9% 65 or older.  The median age was 38 years. For every 100 females, there were 99.1 males.  For every 100 females age 18 and over, there were 91.0 males.

The median household income was $23,750 and the median family income  was $31,250. Males had a median income of $32,083 versus $16,667 for females. The per capita income for the town was $11,873.  About 25.4% of families and 30.0% of the population were below the poverty line, including 44.9% of those under the age of 18 and 22.9% ages 65 or older.

Notable person
 Robby Wells, American college football coach and politician

See also

Central Savannah River Area

References

External links
The News and Farmer and Wadley Herald/ Jefferson Reporter, the county's weekly newspaper and the oldest weekly newspaper in Georgia.

Towns in Jefferson County, Georgia
Towns in Georgia (U.S. state)